C'est déjà ça is a 1993 album recorded by French singer Alain Souchon. It was his eleventh album overall and was released on October 10, 1993. It achieved smash success in France where it remained for 100 weeks in the top 50, including one week at the top, and 108 weeks on the chart. It was also successful in Belgium (Wallonia). It provided two successful singles in France : "Foule sentimentale" (#1) and "L'Amour à la machine" (#21). The album was entirely written by the singer himself, while the music was composed by Laurent Voulzy, Jean-Claude Petit and Souchon's son, Pierre Souchon.

Critical reception 

The album was certified a Diamond disc with over 1 million copies sold. It also earned several awards, notably earning Souchon the Best male singer of the year award at the 1994 NRJ Music Awards. In 1996, he also won the Vincent Scotto prize awarded by the SACEM for the song "Sous les jupes des filles". This song, not released as a single, was nevertheless much aired on the radio.

Track listing 

Source : Allmusic.

Releases

Personnel 
 Produced by Michel Coeuriot
 Michel-Yves Kochmann : guitares (1, 2, 3, 4, 6, 7, 9, 10, 11)
 Basile Leroux : guitares (7, 10)
 Laurent Voulzy : guitares (8), glide et solo basse (8), chœurs (8)
 Laurent Faucheux : batterie (1, 2, 6, 11)
 Guy Delacroix : basse (1, 2, 4, 6), basse acoustique (7, 10)
 Denis Benarrosch : percussions (1, 3, 4, 6, 10, 11)
 Michel Cœuriot : synthétiseurs (1, 3, 4, 8, 9, 11), orgue hammond (2), piano (5, 7), clavinette (6), basse (8), chœurs (8)
 Celmar Engel : programmations des synthétiseurs (3, 4, 11)
 Recorded by Renaud Letang
 Assistant : Bertrand Taussac
 At Studio Ferber and at Studio ICP (Brussel)
 Mixed by Renaud Letang and Michel Cœuriot
 Assistant : Rodolphe Saguinetti
 At Studio Guillaume Tell (Paris)
 Mastering : Greg Calbi à Sterling Sound à New York

Certifications and sales

Charts 

1 Re-issue

References 

1993 albums
Alain Souchon albums